Andrew Gaspar Zamorano Melgar (born February 4, 1995) is a Uruguayan-Chilean footballer who currently plays for club Cerrito as a left-back.

Career statistics

Club

References

External links
 
 

1995 births
Living people
Footballers from Montevideo
Uruguayan footballers
Sportspeople of Chilean descent
Citizens of Chile through descent
Chilean footballers
Sportivo Cerrito players
C.A. Cerro players
Villa Española players
Atenas de San Carlos players
Uruguayan Segunda División players
Uruguayan Primera División players
Uruguayan people of Chilean descent
Chilean people of Uruguayan descent
Naturalized citizens of Chile
Association football defenders